Zaboloto is a rural locality (a village) in Zabolotskoye Rural Settlement, Permsky District, Perm Krai, Russia. The population was 26 as of 2010. There are 10 streets.

Geography 
Zaboloto is located 40 km southwest of Perm (the district's administrative centre) by road. Gorshki is the nearest rural locality.

References 

Rural localities in Permsky District